The Wichita Wings were a professional indoor soccer franchise based in Wichita, Kansas. The Wings were admitted to the Major Indoor Soccer League as an expansion team on August 21, 1979. They played in the Kansas Coliseum, a venue that featured a 200-by-85-foot field and seating for 9,681 fans.

When the MISL (which had since been renamed the Major Soccer League) folded in 1992, the Wings moved to the National Professional Soccer League. At the time the Wings folded, after the 2000–2001 season, they were the oldest professional soccer franchise in the United States. Despite having some of the best records in US indoor soccer, the Wings never won a league championship or reached the league finals.

A new team named after the Wichita Wings began play in the 2011–12 season and shut down after the 2012–2013 season. They were in turn replaced by a new team called the Wichita B-52s who played in the Major Arena Soccer League.

Local Wichita news sources (KWCH, KAKE) have confirmed that yet another new Wichita Wings will be making a return to professional soccer for the upcoming 2019-20 season, although they have not made public which league they will be playing in.

The Wichita Wings have since returned in the MASL 2 Indoor Soccer League. With the demolition of the Kansas Colosseum, the Wings have since returned to play in Hartman Arena in Park City, Kansas.

The team hosted the NPSL All-Star Game in 1996 and 1999.

History

The Founding of the Wichita Wings 
In 1978, Tom Marshall, a local youth soccer promoter with the American Youth Soccer Organization (AYSO), convinced the North American Soccer League's (NASL) Dallas Tornado to come to Wichita to play an exhibition game. Proceeds from the event would benefit the local AYSO organization. On December 1, the Tornado squared off against the Houston Hurricane at the Kansas Coliseum. It was Roy Turner’s last game as a professional. Over the next year, Marshall and other soccer enthusiasts, including Jackie Knapp, worked to find investors and bring a professional soccer team to Wichita. Bob Becker, the owner of Great Plains Corporation, an oil marketing operation, agreed to fund the new team. The newly-christened Wichita Wings joined the Major Indoor Soccer League (MISL) in 1979, the league’s second year of operation.

1979-80 - The Inaugural Season 
Becker hired Roy Turner as head coach and brought in Ward Lawrence to help oversee operations. Tom Marshall became the Wings’ general manager. On November 23, 1979, with only a week to go before the opening game, Marshall ceased to be a part of the Wings organization. The Wings and Marshall disagreed on the details of the separation, but it was to be permanent. Ward Lawrence took over as general manager and Becker brought in Ray Denton to help run day-to-day operations. Mike Ivanow was to be the first signing, but the paperwork sent to his home misspelled his name. The delay resulted in Norman Piper becoming the first Wichita Wing. Piper was joined by the former Dallas Tornado and Liverpool player Kevin Kewley, who became the team's captain. Former Manchester United forward Jimmy Ryan and Argentinian phenom Omar Gomez anchored the team's offense. Roy Turner brought on George Ley as a player-coach. Later in the season, the team added former Manchester United winger Willie Anderson and forward Andy Chapman. Chapman had signed with Arsenal at age 16 and would become a fan favorite in Wichita, becoming the fifth leading scorer in Wings history. Ivanow would be joined in goal by Keith Van Eron. Though Ivanow had US Olympic experience, Van Eron would end up playing more time in goal.

The Wings would end the season at 16-16, barely making the quarterfinals of the playoffs. The Detroit Lightning faced the Wings in that one-game playoff. A victory propelled the Wings into the semifinals, where they would lose the first two games of a three-game series against the Houston Summit. In addition to the Wings' playoff loss, the city of Wichita was faced with the potential loss of the franchise. Owner Bob Becker announced that he would no longer be involved with the team and was attempting to sell the team. Fans and civic leaders began a campaign to sell season tickets for the next year, with hopes that this would help convince a new owner that the people of Wichita wanted to keep the Wings. On April 16, 1980, it was announced that Pizza Hut co-founder Frank Carney and a group of investors would buy the team. The Wings would return for a second season.

1980-86 - The Carney-Kentling Era 
Bob Becker's departure as owner brought wholesale change to the organization. Ward Lawrence, Ray Denton, and Jackie Knapp all departed. Frank Carney brought Bill Kentling with him from Pizza Hut to take over the role of general manager. Kentling had previously served as Director of Corporate Communications at Pizza Hut and, prior to that, the vice-president of the National Baseball Congress. Kentling brought in Director of Media Relations Steve Shaad, Director of Sales and Marketing Dave Bennett, and Director of Operations Virginia Creamer to help run the team. Future KWCH sports director Bruce Haertl became the radio voice of the Wings on KFH radio.

On the field, the Wings looked to athletes from Denmark to help improve the team. Bundesliga veteran Jorgen Kristensen and a young talent named Kim Røntved made a huge impact on the team. Kristensen would become the MISL Passmaster while Røntved was twice named MISL Defender of the Year and would become the Wings' all-time leader in goals scored. Mike Dowler from Wales secured the goalkeeper position after a battle with Keith Van Eron. Dowler would earn an MISL record four shutouts in his career with the Wings. The team's popularity increased in the 1980-81 season in part due to a controversy involving the San Francisco Fog's forward Mike Mancini. On December 28, 1980, in a Wings blowout win, Mancini punched Jorgen Kristensen hard enough to drop him to the ground. The incident was televised, thus leading to a great deal of media coverage. Bill Kentling credited this incident with helping to improve attendance. That season was the beginning of the Wings' epic rivalry with the St. Louis Steamers. The Wings would meet St. Louis in the semifinals of the 1981 playoffs. In the third and decisive game, the Steamers would come from behind to beat the Wings in a shootout. The game was marred by an ugly foul against Mike Dowler, sending him to the bench for the remainder of the game. Many considered it the greatest game in MISL history.

The 1981-82 season saw the Wings bring in two Englishmen that had a lasting impact on the team. Sheffield United alum Terry Nicholl became known as "The General" during his time in Wichita due to his ability to coach on the field. Jeff Bourne was a potent scorer who had played in the English first division with Derby County. The Danish connection continued to bear fruit as the Wings added midfielder Frank Rasmussen to the squad. That year's Wings squad was very successful, finishing with a 27-17 record. Though the Wings would defeat the Memphis Americans in the playoff quarterfinals, they would once again fall to the Steamers in the semis. Off the field, a new force provided a strong backbone to the Wings efforts. The Orange Army, a group of dedicated fans, followed the Wings wherever they went. They would famously meet the Wings at the airport upon the team's return from every road trip.

Omar Gomez returned to the Wings for the 1982-83 season, after spending time playing for the New York Arrows. He would end the year second on the team in both goals and assists. Kim's older brother, Per Rontved, the former Danish national team captain, joined the Wings as well. Andy Chapman led the team in scoring with 48 goals. At 27-21 by season's end, the Wings finished second in their division, just ahead of the Steamers. They would face St. Louis again in the playoffs, this time in the quarterfinals. The Wings would finally break the curse. In game three, at the Kansas Coliseum, the Wings would triumph in a game with a variety of unusual events: Kim Røntved scored on an almost unbelievable header from beyond 100 feet; Per Rontved made a 125-foot shorthanded shot; and Steamer defender Steve Pecher scuffled with a Wings fan while in the penalty box, resulting in his ejection from the game.

St. Louis would get revenge at the end of the 1983-84 season, sweeping the Wings in the semifinals. That year's squad featured a new arrival from Scotland: Ian Anderson. He would lead the team in blocks. Andy Chapman finished second in scoring in the MISL, with 53 goals. Kim Røntved was named the league's Defender of the Year. The team's finances were bolstered by excellent attendance at 9,391 per game. The 1984-85 season was a disappointing one for the team. The Wings would end with a losing record of 21-26 and lose in the Wild Card round of the playoffs. However, they added two players that would have a long-term impact. Terry Rowe was a talented defender from London, England. Danish sensation Erik Rasmussen earned his nickname, "The Wizard," due to his dynamic abilities on the ball. He would become a record-setting player during his career with the Wings. In 1988, he earned the team's only MISL MVP award.

The 1985-86 season brought a change in goal. The departure of Mike Dowler to the Tacoma Stars resulted in a pair of new goalkeepers joining the Wings. Jan Olesen from Denmark and Seamus McDonagh from Ireland would split goalkeeping duties. Olesen would be remembered for scoring a goal in a game against the St. Louis Steamers. He dribbled the ball from his own goal to the other end of the field, kicking the ball between Slobo Ilijevski's legs. Englishman Barry Wallace, Scotsman Dave Hoggan, and Californian Mike Fox joined the team that season. Each would have an important impact. But no one had an impact like "The American Dream," Chico Borja. The former Las Vegas American became a Wings player thanks to the dissolution of the Vegas franchise. Borja would become a star from the midfield position, becoming the all-time Wings assist leader by the end of his career. Despite a 27-21 season, the Wings would lose in the first round of the playoffs to the Tacoma Stars.

1986-92 - Change is Afoot 
Big changes came to the front office and coaching staff in 1986. Francis Dale stepped down as commissioner of the MISL and the Wings' own Bill Kentling took his place. When Kentling went to the new league headquarters in New York City, it was decided that Roy Turner was the logical choice to replace him. Turner stepped down as head coach and was named President of the Wings. The changes continued when Frank Carney decided to step down as managing general partner. William "Bill" Oliver Jr. took his place at the top of the Wings' power structure. Replacing Turner as coach was an important and difficult task. The team convinced Scottish legend Charlie Cooke, the "Bonnie Prince," to fill Turner's shoes. Cooke instituted an up-tempo style that emphasized defensive pressure. It wasn't always popular with the older veterans. In 1986-87, the Wings added the young forward Mark Kerlin from Arizona and the Welsh superstar Mickey Thomas of Chelsea and Manchester United fame. A rookie from California named Dale Ervine would have the biggest long-term impact. At the end of his eight years in Wichita, "The Bruin" would be second on the all-time goals scored list. The Wings would lose in the division semifinals to Tacoma in 1987 after finishing the season with a 27-25 record.

In 1987-88, the Wings brought in Nenad "Ziggy" Zigante to replace Seamus McDonagh in goal. Former US Olympian Jean Willrich and longtime indoor pro Mike Stankovic also joined the squad in Charlie Cooke's second year. But it was a season that Cooke himself would not finish. On January 30, 1988, Cooke and assistant coach Norman Piper were fired after starting the year 11-16. Former Wing Terry Nicholl would take over as head coach, with Kevin Kewley adding "assistant coach" to his duties on the field. Though the Wings would have their worst ever season, finishing 23-33, two Wings would end up leading the MISL. Erik Rasmussen became the scoring champion and league MVP, while Zigante was named the league's Newcomer of the Year.

The MISL would last until the end of the 1991-92 season, but Terry Nicholl's tenure as coach lasted only until February 1991. After a poor start to the season, he was replaced by original Wings' coach Roy Turner. The Wings would fail to achieve a winning record during those final years of the MISL. However, the team would add several players that had positive, multi-year impacts on the team, including defender Tommy Soehn, midfielder Perry Van der Beck, former Derby County and Northern Ireland national team player Victor Moreland, Yugoslav midfielder Goran Hunjak, goalkeeper Kris Peat, Baltimore Blast striker David Byrne.

1992-01 - The NPSL Years 
In 1992, after several years of struggling to keep franchises, the MISL folded. The Wings, under a new ownership group led by local businessman Mike Relihan, joined the National Professional Soccer League (NPSL). The player salaries were smaller and it lacked some of the large cities that the MISL was proud to include, but it provided the Wings a league in which to play. In 1996, Roy Turner left the team. He would be remembered as the man most associated with the Wichita Wings since their inception in 1979. Though the Wings would have some success on the field during the NPSL years, their home attendance would never equal that of the 1980s. In 1998, Randy and Shirley Johnson would take over as owners of the Wings. When the team folded in 2001, it would be the longest-running soccer franchise in the United States.

Ownership

Management

Coaching staff

Statistics

Wings League Leaders

Wings All-Time Leaders

Wings Team Record and Attendance: 1979-2001

Television and Radio 
The Wings would appear nationally on USA, ESPN, and CBS. Their first local television contract was with KSN-TV (NBC) and announcer Dave Armstrong in 1981-82. KSN would continue to broadcast the Wings through the 1985-86 season. Other announcers included Craig Bolerjack, Mike Kennedy, and Steve Dennis. Former Wing Joe Howarth and Director of Media Relations Steve Shaad, respectively, would serve as the color commentator for several of those seasons. The 1986-87 season saw KAKE-TV (ABC) take over the broadcast. Mark Allan would be their announcer through the 1988-89 season. The Wings would have no television contract thereafter.

KFH Radio (1330 AM) would broadcast the Wings from 1981 through 1986, with first Bruce Haertl and then Jim Hawley announcing. Steve Shaad, Blake Schreck, and Klaus Kollmai served as color commentators on the KFH broadcasts. In 1986, KRZ (1240 AM) took over the radio broadcasting, with Dave Phillips as announcer. As KNSS, they would continue to broadcast the Wings through the 1989-90 season. Phillips would be the voice of the Wings with KZSN (1480 AM) through the 1993 season. Steve Dennis took over KZSN's announcing duties in 1994 and continued through the transition to KFH in 1995-96. Former Wings goalkeeper Kris Peat served as announcer in 1996-97. In 1997, Rob Barzegar and KQAM (1480 AM) became the Wings radio broadcaster.

Arenas
The Kansas Coliseum (Britt Brown Arena)

During home games in the mid-late 1980s, the Wings used the "Gonna Fly Now" theme from the movie "Rocky" to celebrate Wings' goals.  For some time this music was also used for player introductions.

References

Defunct indoor soccer clubs in the United States
Association football clubs established in 1979
Association football clubs disestablished in 2001
Sports in Wichita, Kansas
Major Indoor Soccer League (1978–1992) teams
National Professional Soccer League (1984–2001) teams
Defunct soccer clubs in Kansas
Soccer clubs in Kansas
1979 establishments in Kansas
2001 disestablishments in Kansas